Arrow Films is a British independent film distributor and restorer specialising in world cinema, arthouse, horror and classic films. It sells Ultra HD Blu-rays, Blu-rays and DVDs online, and also operates its own subscription video on-demand service, Arrow Player.

History
Arrow Films was established in 1991 as a family firm in Shenley, Hertfordshire. Whilst Arrow Films was the company's primary brand for theatrical releases, the Arrow Video label was created in 2009 specialising in cult and horror home video. In September 2011, the ArrowDrome brand was created for budget DVDs. The Arrow Academy and Arrow TV labels specialised in the world cinema and Nordic noir genres respectively, but since 2021, each has been merged into Arrow Video. In the same year, the company launched Arrow Player, a subscription video on-demand service in the UK, US and Canada.

Arrow began releasing films in the North American market in 2015. As of 2022, it operated in the UK, Ireland, US and Canada.

In 2021, Arrow Films was sold to THG plc for £18.5 million.

Reception
Arrow has been listed by The Guardian twice as their home video distributor of the year. In 2011, they listed Arrow as the Label of the Year noting their release of Bicycle Thieves, Rififi and Les Diaboliques and specifically praising their releases of horror films, where they "truly excel". The second time was in 2013 when they awarded Arrow Films "Label of the Year", noting their releases of Lifeforce and releases of television shows such as Borgen and The Killing as highlights.

Camera Obscura: The Walerian Borowczyk Collection was voted the best home video release of 2014 by several publications, including Sight and Sound and Little White Lies, and won the Focal International Award for Best Archival Restoration Project and the Cinema Ritrovato Award for Best DVD Series/Best Box.

References

THG (company)
Film distributors of the United Kingdom
Home video distributors
Home video companies of the United Kingdom
Home video lines
1991 establishments in England
Home video companies established in 1991
Subscription video on demand services
Film preservation organizations